Johannes Marcellus Maria "Han" Polman (born 16 January 1963) is a Dutch politician of the Democrats 66 (D66) party. He has been the King's Commissioner of Zeeland since 1 March 2013. Previously he was Mayor of Bergen op Zoom and Noordwijkerhout.

Biography
Polman entered politics at a young age, he worked as a civil servant at the Ministry of the Interior and Kingdom Relations from 1986 until 2000, he was only twenty-three at the time. He served as a municipal councillor in The Hague from 12 April 1994 to 1 December 2001. He also served as Director of Welfare in Vlaardingen from 2000 to 1 December 2001, when he became Mayor of Noordwijkerhout (former municipality since 2019). Upon his appointment, he was the youngest mayor in the Netherlands, at the age of thirty-eight. In 2005 he left Noordwijkerhout when he was selected as Mayor of Bergen op Zoom. On 1 March 2013, he succeeded Karla Peijs as the Queen's Commissioner (from 30 April 2013: King's Commissioner) of Zeeland.

Polman is married and has four children.

References

External links
 Drs. J.M.M. (Han) Polman, Parlement.com

1963 births
Living people
20th-century Dutch civil servants
21st-century Dutch civil servants
21st-century Dutch politicians
Democrats 66 politicians
King's and Queen's Commissioners of Zeeland
Mayors in South Holland
Mayors of Bergen op Zoom
Municipal councillors of The Hague
People from Noordwijkerhout
People from Ootmarsum
University of Twente alumni